The 1914 Minnesota gubernatorial election took place on November 3, 1914. Democratic Party of Minnesota candidate Winfield Scott Hammond defeated Republican Party of Minnesota challenger William E. Lee.

Republican primary

Candidates

Nominated 

 William E. Lee, former Speaker of the Minnesota House of Representatives

Eliminated in primary 

 Adolph Olson Eberhart, incumbent Governor of Minnesota, former Lieutenant Governor and State Senator
 Elwood L. Raab, mining engineer

Results 

Republicans conducted a ranked-choice primary, though second choices were not used, as Lee received over 50% in the first round.

Democratic primary

Candidates

Nominated 

 Winfield Scott Hammond, U.S. Representative

Eliminated in primary 

 Daniel W. Lawler, former Mayor of St. Paul

Results

Results

See also
 List of Minnesota gubernatorial elections

References

External links
 http://www.sos.state.mn.us/home/index.asp?page=653
 http://www.sos.state.mn.us/home/index.asp?page=657

Gubernatorial
1914
Minnesota
November 1914 events